Ray Gordon (born 1965) is a former NBL Melbourne Tigers player who was a member of the Tigers inaugural NBL championship team in 1993 and 1997.

References
Ray Gordon's profile at Basketpedya.com

1965 births
Living people
Melbourne Tigers players
Place of birth missing (living people)
Date of birth missing (living people)
20th-century Australian people